The men's 800 metres at the 2017 World Championships in Athletics was held at the London Olympic Stadium on 5, 6, and 8 August.

Summary
Defending champion David Rudisha (Kenya) couldn't recover from an early season injury in time to return.  There were no Olympic podium athletes in this field.  The returning silver medalist Adam Kszczot (Poland) made an impressive move in his semi-final to get into the final.  The returning bronze medalist, 2015 phenom Amel Tuka (Bosnia and Herzegovina) didn't make it out of the heats.   The fastest athlete of the year Emmanuel Kipkurui Korir didn't qualify from his semi.

As the final began, the runner with the fastest personal best, =#3 all time Nigel Amos (Botswana) ran a fast turn and was attempting to take the tangent from the break line in his lane 5, but Brandon McBride (Canada), ran a faster turn and cut more sharply from lane 7, effectively interrupting Amos from taking control of the early pace.  Looking for running room Amos also cut in, tangling elbows with Kipyegon Bett (Kenya), then bouncing to the side, getting caught also behind Thiago André (Brazil).  McBride held the lead with André in his shadow.   The first time down the home stretch, Amos moved outside to get around André into second place.  McBride led through a moderate 50.76 first lap.  Through the next turn, Bett was looking to get past Amos, finally also running wide on the backstretch, getting past McBride.  From the back of the pack, Pierre-Ambroise Bosse (France) had avoided the battle so far.  He went wider on the backstretch, running in lane 3 past the field, including the battling leaders, taking the lead unencumbered as they entered the final turn.   Through the final turn, the battle continued behind him, Amos and Bett exchanging elbows again.  From near the back of the back Adam Kszczot (Poland) began his kick, with Kyle Langford (GBR) in his wake, passing people.  By the time he reached the final straightaway, Bosse had a 3 metre lead on Bett, with Amos another metre back.  Bett and Amos were unable to gain on Bosse, but in lane 2, Kszczot and Langford were, passing people including Mohammed Aman (Ethiopia), Amos and 10 metres before the finish, Kszczot passed Bett to capture silver.  Bett barely held off a fast closing Langford for bronze.

After the race, Bosse looked at the video scoreboard, pointing at himself in surprise at his win.

Records
Before the competition records were as follows:

No records were set at the competition.

Qualification standard
The standard to qualify automatically for entry was 1:45.90.

Schedule
The event schedule, in local time (UTC+1), was as follows:

Results

Heats
The first round took place on 5 August in six heats as follows:

The first three in each heat ( Q ) and the next six fastest ( q ) qualified for the semifinals. The overall results were as follows:

Semifinals
The semifinals took place on 6 August in three heats as follows:

The first two in each heat ( Q ) and the next two fastest ( q ) qualified for the final. The overall results were as follows:

Final
The final took place on 8 August at 21:36. The results were as follows (photo finish):

References

800
800 metres at the World Athletics Championships